Bhasa redirects to Bhāsa, Sanskrit playwright

It can also refer to:
Bhāṣā or bahasa, the word for language in South Asian/ South-east Asian countries
Bhasa, Bishnupur, a census town in West Bengal, India
Newar language, known officially in Nepal as Nepal Bhasa